Escape Artist Records was an American independent record label formed in 1997 and based in suburban Philadelphia, Pennsylvania. The label, which helped to launch the careers of bands such as Isis, Keelhaul and Time in Malta, ceased operations in 2008.

Past artist roster 

27
American Heritage
Anodyne
Blunderbuss
Burn It Down
Collapsar
The Dream Is Dead
Ganglahia
In Pieces
Isis
Lickgoldensky
KEN mode
Keelhaul
Playing Enemy
Theory of Ruin
Time in Malta
Under Pressure

American record labels